is a mountain located in Misasa, Tottori, Japan. It is one of the 100 Famous Mountains of Chūgoku.

References 

Wakasugi